Raw Power is a weekly heavy metal/rock music television programme, with connections to Raw magazine, and produced by Music Box Ltd, which aired in Britain on ITV from 1990 until 1993. The name was eventually changed to Noisy Mothers which aired nationwide in 1994 and 1995 and the format of the show changed. The show was axed in late 1995, to make way for an overhaul of scheduling.

Origins
Before the advent of rock-focussed satellite television stations such as MTV2 and Kerrang!, heavy metal and rock music in general got very little airplay on British national network television. Featuring live performances, music videos, interviews and competitions (all with a heavy metal theme) the show aired in the early hours of Saturday mornings (sometime between midnight and 3:00am), and sought to redress the balance.

Before Raw magazine got involved, the show was known as The Power Hour, originally presented by Dante Bonutto and Amanda Redington, and later by Alison Craig, Jacky Lynn and Nikki Groocock. It used to be shown from 1985 to 1990 on cable and satellite music channel Music Box, which stopped being a channel on its own to become producer of music shows for major British broadcasters including ITV.

The theme tune of Raw Power was an edited version of the guitar solo from "Love in an Elevator" by Aerosmith. The show was filmed at The Marquee in London and on various locations across the country, in Europe and the United States. Megadeth and Pantera were also used as theme tunes on Raw Power and Noisy Mothers.

Presenters
Originally presented by Phil Alexander (then editor of Raw magazine) and Nikki Groocock, the show was later to feature Ann Kirk replacing Nikki Groocock in mid-1991. Ann Kirk was the producer of later episodes of The Power Hour and created and produced Raw Power and Noisy Mothers. Phil Alexander was replaced by Krusher as presenter, who also appeared in a segment entitled "Krusher's Kouch" (later in Noisy Mothers''' "Krusher's Kosmos"). The show was directed by Andrew Nicholson and Jerry Duller. Camera work was by John Keedwell, who went on after the show closed to produce the Bon Jovi Access All Areas, a documentary film of their world tour in 1988 to 1989.  The segment would always start with Krusher's greeting of "Droogies, boozers, strumpets and losers," and featured CD reviews, competitions and irreverent comment. Krusher would usually be accompanied by a Jack Russell Terrier named Bullseye (which died in 1995).

Later editions also featured various bands presenting the show, including The Almighty, Thunder, Alice Cooper, Megadeth, Iron Maiden and Motörhead and later on Noisy Mothers, Sepultura, Pride & Glory, Extreme, and Paradise Lost. Raw Power/Noisy Mothers would film band performances and cover the major rock festivals such as Donington Monsters of Rock and Reading. Band performances filmed include The Black Crowes, Blind Melon, and Megadeth. Raw Power and Noisy Mothers'' won "Best TV Show" category in all the rock music magazines in Britain during its run on ITV.

References

External links

ITV (TV network) original programming
Heavy metal television series
British heavy metal music
1990 in British music
1990s in British music
1990s British music television series
1990 British television series debuts
1995 British television series endings